USNS Paul Buck (T-AOT-1122) was originally constructed in 1985 by American Ship building Company, Tampa, Florida for Ocean Product Tankers of Houston for a long term charter to the United States Navy and operated by Military Sealift Command. The ship was delivered on 7 July 1985. It is a T-5 Tanker. The ship was named after Merchant Marine Paul Buck, who was awarded the Merchant Marine Distinguished Service Medal.

Antarctic missions

Paul Buck made frequent deliveries of fuel to the Antarctic for resupply. This was the most common route that this ship made delivering a variety of fuel types to the base. It was always escorted by an ice breaker. 

In 2010 the vessel was replaced by Empire State and Paul Buck was taken out of service and transferred to the Maritime Commission's National Defense Reserve Fleet. The vessel was laid up in "Interim Hold" as of April 2020.

References

External links
 Photo gallery at navsource.org
 Tanker USNS Paul Buck at the Ice Pier at scottafar.com
 USNS Paul Buck Delivers to McMurdo at Seafarers International Union

1985 ships
Champion-class tankers